Alexander Moffat, OBE, RSA, (born 1943) known as Sandy Moffat, is a painter, author, philosopher, and teacher.

Biography
Alexander Moffat OBE DLitt RSA studied at Edinburgh Art College, where he was taught by William Gillies, Robin Philipson and James Cumming. He concentrated on portraiture, described as "Scottish realism", and was among the leading Scottish intellectuals of the 1960s. He was Head of Painting and Printmaking at the Glasgow School of Art, where he worked for 25 years until 2005 and is credited with helping to steer the resurgence of figurative painting at the GSA. Painters like the so called New Glasgow Boys of the late 1980s including Steven Campbell, Peter Howson, Adrian Wiszniewski and Ken Currie, in addition to Jenny Saville and Alison Watt, were amongst his students. Sandy Moffat, in conjunction with Sam Ainsley and David Harding, individually and collectively nurtured generations of artists who have gone on to make Glasgow's reputation as a leading centre of creative practice.

Collections
Examples of Moffat's work are held in the collections of the National Galleries of Scotland, the Russell-Cotes art gallery, the University of Edinburgh, Fife Council, the University of St Andrews, the Museum of the Isles, the Orkney Islands Council, the North Ayrshire Council, and the Royal Scottish Academy of Art and Architecture.

Exhibitions
 Scottish National Portrait Gallery
 The Press Club, Warsaw
 The Open Eye Gallery, Edinburgh
 The Peacocks Visual Arts Gallery, Aberdeen.

Books

 Arts of Independence (with Alan Riach), Luath Press, 2014
 Arts of Resistance (with Alan Riach), Luath Press, 2009

See also

 Portrait painting in Scotland

References

1943 births
Scottish artists
Living people
Officers of the Order of the British Empire